The 1925 North Dakota Agricultural Bison football team was an American football team that represented North Dakota Agricultural College (now known as North Dakota State University) in the North Central Conference (NCC) during the 1925 college football season. In its first season under head coach Ion Cortright, the team compiled a 5–0–2 record (4–0–2 against NCC opponents) and tied for the NCC championship.

Schedule

References

North Dakota Agricultural
North Dakota State Bison football seasons
North Central Conference football champion seasons
College football undefeated seasons
North Dakota Agricultural Bison football